Amir Garib is a 1974 Indian Hindi-language film produced and directed by Mohan Kumar. The film stars Dev Anand, Hema Malini, Prem Nath, Tanuja, Sujit Kumar and Ranjeet. The film's music is by Laxmikant Pyarelal.

Plot 

Manmohan alias Moni lives a dual life. One as a musician, and the other as a thief with the name of Bagula Bhagat, whose prime agenda is to rob the rich, and spread the wealth with the poor. He meets with a young woman named Sunita alias Soni, and both fall in love with each other. Things change for the better for Soni, when she meets her wealthy long-lost father, Daulatram, and goes to live with him. She decides not to have to do anything with Moni. When Moni attempts to meet Soni to find out why she has rejected him, she refuses to meet him. Then Moni finds out that Soni is not who she claims she is, and definitely not the daughter of Daulatram, but the daughter of another wealthy man named Nandlal, who had died under mysterious and destitute circumstance.

Cast 
Dev Anand as Manmohan "Moni"/Bagula Bhagat
Hema Malini as Sunita "Soni"
Tanuja as Rekha, Ranjeet's sister
Prem Nath as Daulatram
Ranjeet as Ranjeet
Sujit Kumar as Police Inspector Anand and Anju's fiancé
Nazima as Anju, Manmohan's sister
Sajjan (actor) as Seth Nandlal, Sunita's father
Raj Mehra as Police Commissioner
Sulochana Latkar as Parvati
Mehmood Jr.
Chaman Puri
Birbal
Mohan Choti as Murthi
Mumtaz Begum
Ram Mohan
Krishnakant
Dulari
Tun Tun
Rajan Kapoor
Moolchand
Helen
Uma Dutt
Master Sailesh
Master Ravi

Production 
Rajesh Khanna was originally cast in the lead role, but replaced with Anand due to his truancy from meetings with Kumar.

Soundtrack

References

External links 
 

1974 films
1970s Hindi-language films
Films scored by Laxmikant–Pyarelal
Films directed by Mohan Kumar